Marble Hall was the private residence of Sir Catchick Paul Chater, co-founder of Hongkong Land. It was situated at 1 Conduit Road, Hong Kong, and constructed 1901–1904 from imported European marble. Historians regard it as one of the finest ever examples of architecture in Hong Kong.

History
Sir Paul chose a site above Victoria, 500 feet above sea level. Designed by Leigh & Orange, a most sumptuous residence was constructed from imported marble quarried in Italy and Greece and finished in Belgium. It had extensive gardens, and a gatehouse. Historians regard 'Marble Hall' as among the finest constructions ever executed in Hong Kong. Externally, it was constructed of stuccoed brick. Inside was a magnificent staircase made from Italian marble; it was finished in teak and mahogany.(p41)

Chater died in 1926, and bequeathed Marble Hall and its entire contents, including his unique collection of porcelain and paintings, to Hong Kong. Chater's wife lived in Marble Hall as a life tenant until her death in 1935. Ownership then passed to the government. It became "Admiralty House" – the official residence of the Naval Commander-in-Chief, and was commandeered by Japanese during their occupation.

Post-war
Marble Hall accidentally burned down in 1946, and the government buildings occupied the site since its demolition in 1953. Government residences named 'Chater Hall Flats' are today located on the site of Marble Hall.

All that remains today is the gatekeeper's lodge, which has been given a Grade 2 classification by the Antiquities Advisory Board.

References

Houses completed in 1904
Former buildings and structures in Hong Kong
Houses in Hong Kong